Gaia 1 is an open cluster of stars discovered in 2017 by astronomers using data from the Gaia Space Observatory. It is a high-mass and bright cluster, but remained unseen in prior astronomy due to veiling glare in ordinary telescopes overwhelmed by the star Sirius, which lies 10 arcmins west.

The Gaia 1 cluster was detected by researchers applying automated "star gauging" to the Gaia observatory's data on star locations.  This analysis surprisingly indicated a prominent concentration of stars, previously unknown and uncataloged, adjacent to Sirius.  Gaia observed a cluster population of approximately 1,200 stars down to Gaia magnitude 19.  Analysis of 2MASS data for those stars shows a red giant branch and a pronounced red clump that allows the absolute magnitude of the stars to be deduced and the distance calculated.  Fitting the red giant branch also allows the age of the cluster to be calculated at 6.3 billion years.

References

External links
 How do you find a star cluster? Easy, simply count the stars. European Space Agency 15 November 2017

Open clusters
Canis Major